In linguistics, a stratum (Latin for "layer") or strate is a language that influences or is influenced by another through contact. A substratum or substrate is a language that has lower power or prestige than another, while a superstratum or superstrate is the language that has higher power or prestige. Both substratum and superstratum languages influence each other, but in different ways. An adstratum or adstrate is a language that is in contact with another language in a neighbor population without having identifiably higher or lower prestige. The notion of "strata" was first developed by the Italian linguist Graziadio Isaia Ascoli (1829–1907), and became known in the English-speaking world through the work of two different authors in 1932.

Thus, both concepts apply to a situation where an intrusive language establishes itself in the territory of another, typically as the result of migration. Whether the superstratum case (the local language persists and the intrusive language disappears) or the substratum one (the local language disappears and the intrusive language persists) applies will normally only be evident after several generations, during which the intrusive language exists within a diaspora culture. In order for the intrusive language to persist (substratum case), the immigrant population will either need to take the position of a political elite or immigrate in significant numbers relative to the local population (i. e., the intrusion qualifies as an invasion or colonisation; an example would be the Roman Empire giving rise to Romance languages outside Italy, displacing Gaulish and many other Indo-European languages). The superstratum case refers to elite invading populations that eventually adopt the language of the native lower classes. An example would be the Burgundians and Franks in France, who eventually abandoned their Germanic dialects in favor of other Indo-European languages of the Romance branch, profoundly influencing the local speech in the process.

Substratum  

A substratum (plural: substrata) or substrate is a language that an intrusive language influences, which may or may not ultimately change it to become a new language. The term is also used of substrate interference; i.e. the influence the substratum language exerts on the replacing language. According to some classifications, this is one of three main types of linguistic interference: substratum interference differs from both adstratum, which involves no language replacement but rather mutual borrowing between languages of equal "value", and superstratum, which refers to the influence a socially dominating language has on another, receding language that might eventually be relegated to the status of a substratum language.

In a typical case of substrate interference, a Language A occupies a given territory and another Language B arrives in the same territory (brought, for example, with migrations of population). Language B then begins to supplant language A: the speakers of Language A abandon their own language in favor of the other language, generally because they believe that it will help them achieve certain goals within government, the workplace, and in social settings. During the language shift, however, the receding language A still influences language B (for example, through the transfer of loanwords, place names, or grammatical patterns from A to B).

In most cases, the ability to identify substrate influence in a language requires knowledge of the structure of the substrate language. This can be acquired in numerous ways:
 The substrate language, or some later descendant of it, still survives in a part of its former range;
 Written records of the substrate language may exist to various degrees;
 The substrate language itself may be unknown entirely, but it may have surviving close relatives that can be used as a base of comparison.

One of the first-identified cases of substrate influence is an example of a substrate language of the second type: Gaulish, from the ancient Celtic people the Gauls. The Gauls lived in the modern French-speaking territory before the arrival of the Romans, namely the invasion of Julius Caesar's army. Given the cultural, economic and political advantages that came with being a Latin speaker, the Gauls eventually abandoned their language in favor of the language brought to them by the Romans, which evolved in this region until eventually it took the form of the French language that is known today. The Gaulish speech disappeared in the late Roman era, but remnants of its vocabulary survive in some French words (approximately 200) as well as place-names of Gaulish origin. It is also posited that some structural changes in French were shaped at least in part by Gaulish influence including diachronic sound changes and sandhi phenomena due to the retention of Gaulish phonetic patterns after the adoption of Latin, calques such as aveugle ("blind", literally without eyes, from Latin ab oculis, which was a calque on the Gaulish word  with the same semantic construction as modern French) with other Celtic calques possibly including "oui", the word for yes, while syntactic and morphological effects are also posited.

Other examples of substrate languages are the influence of the now extinct North Germanic Norn language on the Scots dialects of the Shetland and Orkney islands. In the Arab Middle East and North Africa, colloquial Arabic dialects, most especially Levantine, Egyptian, and Maghreb dialects, often exhibit significant substrata from other regional Semitic (especially Aramaic), Iranian, and Berber languages. Yemeni Arabic has Modern South Arabian, Old South Arabian and Himyaritic substrata.

Typically, Creole languages have multiple substrata, with the actual influence of such languages being indeterminate.

Unattested substrata
In the absence of all three lines of evidence mentioned above, linguistic substrata may be difficult to detect. Substantial indirect evidence is needed to infer the former existence of a substrate. The nonexistence of a substrate is difficult to show, and to avoid digressing into speculation, burden of proof must lie on the side of the scholar claiming the influence of a substrate. The principle of uniformitarianism and results from the study of human genetics suggest that many languages have formerly existed that have since then been replaced under expansive language families, such as Indo-European, Afro-Asiatic, Uralic or Bantu. However, it is not a given that such expansive languages would have acquired substratum influence from the languages they have replaced.

Several examples of this type of substratum have still been claimed. For example, the earliest form of the Germanic languages may have been influenced by a non-Indo-European language, purportedly the source of about one quarter of the most ancient Germanic vocabulary. There are similar arguments for a Sanskrit substrate, a Greek one, and a substrate underlying the Sami languages. Relatively clear examples are the Finno-Ugric languages of the Chude and the "Volga Finns" (Merya, Muromian, and Meshcheran): while unattested, their existence has been noted in medieval chronicles, and one or more of them have left substantial influence in the Northern Russian dialects. By contrast more contentious cases are the Vasconic substratum theory and Old European hydronymy, which hypothesize large families of substrate languages across western Europe. Some smaller-scale unattested substrates that remain under debate involve alleged extinct branches of the Indo-European family, such as "Nordwestblock" substrate in the Germanic languages, and a "Temematic" substrate in Balto-Slavic (proposed by Georg Holzer).  The name Temematic is an abbreviation of "tenuis, media, media aspirata, tenuis", referencing a  sound shift presumed common to the group.

When a substrate language or its close relatives cannot be directly studied, their investigation is rooted in the study of etymology and linguistic typology. The study of unattested substrata often begins from the study of substrate words, which lack a clear etymology. Such words can in principle still be native inheritance, lost everywhere else in the language family; but they might in principle also originate from a substrate. The sound structure of words of unknown origin — their phonology and morphology — can often suggest hints in either direction. So can their meaning: words referring to the natural landscape, in particular indigenous fauna and flora, have often been found especially likely to derive from substrate languages. None of these conditions, however, is sufficient by itself to claim any one word as originating from an unknown substratum. Occasionally words that have been proposed to be of substrate origin will be found out to have cognates in more distantly related languages after all, and therefore likely native: an example is Proto-Indo-European *mori 'sea', found widely in the northern and western Indo-European languages, but in more eastern Indo-European languages only in Ossetic.

Concept history
Although the influence of the prior language when a community speaks (and adopts) a new one may have been informally acknowledged beforehand, the concept was formalized and popularized initially in the late 19th century. As historical phonology emerged as a discipline, the initial dominant viewpoint was that influences from language contact on phonology and grammar should be assumed to be marginal, and an internal explanation should always be favored if possible; as articulated by Max Mueller in 1870,  ("there are no mixed languages"). However, in the 1880s, dissent began to crystallize against this viewpoint. Within Romance language linguistics, the 1881 Lettere glottologiche of Graziadio Isaia Ascoli argued that the early phonological development of French and other Gallo-Romance languages was shaped by the retention by Celts of their "oral dispositions" even after they had switched to Latin. The related but distinct concept of creole languages was used to counter Mueller's view in 1884, by Hugo Schuchardt. In modern historical linguistics, debate persists on the details of how language contact may induce structural changes, but the respective extremes of "all change is contact" and "there are no structural changes ever" have largely been abandoned in favor of a set of conventions on how to demonstrate contact induced structural changes, which includes adequate knowledge of the two languages in question, a historical explanation, and evidence that the contact-induced phenomenon did not exist in the recipient language before contact, among other guidelines.

Superstratum
A superstratum (plural: superstrata) or superstrate offers the counterpart to a substratum. When a different language influences a base language to result in a new language, linguists label the influencing language a superstratum and the influenced language a substratum.

A superstrate may also represent an imposed linguistic element akin to what occurred with English and Norman after the Norman Conquest of 1066 when use of the English language carried low prestige. The international scientific vocabulary coinages from Greek and Latin roots adopted by European languages (and subsequently by other languages) to describe scientific topics (sociology, zoology, philosophy, botany, medicine, all "-logy" words, etc.) can also be termed a superstratum, although for this last case, "adstratum" might be a better designation (despite the prestige of science and of its language). In the case of French, for example, Latin is the superstrate and Gaulish the substrate.

Some linguists contend that Japanese (and Japonic languages in general) consists of an Altaic superstratum projected onto an Austronesian substratum. Some scholars also argue for the existence of Altaic superstrate influences on varieties of Chinese spoken in Northern China. In this case, however, the superstratum refers to influence, not language succession. Other views detect substrate effects.

Adstratum

An adstratum (plural: adstrata) or adstrate is a language that through its prestige is a source of lexical borrowings to another. Generally, the term is used about languages in particular geolinguistic or geopolitical contexts. For example, early in England's history, Old Norse served as an adstrate, contributing to the lexical structure of Old English.

The phenomenon is less common today in standardized linguistic varieties and more common in colloquial forms of speech since modern nations tend to favour one single linguistic variety (often corresponding to the dialect of the capital and other important regions) over others. In India, where dozens of languages are widespread, many languages could be said to share an adstratal relationship, but Hindi is certainly a dominant adstrate in North India. A different example would be the sociolinguistic situation in Belgium, where the French and Dutch languages have roughly the same status, and could justifiably be called adstrates to each other having each one provided a large set of lexical specifications to the other.

The term adstratum is also used to identify systematic influences or a layer of borrowings in a given language from another language independently of whether the two languages continue coexisting as separate entities. Many modern languages have an appreciable adstratum from English due to the cultural influence and economic preponderance of the United States on international markets and previously colonization by the British Empire which made English a global lingua franca. The Greek and Latin coinages adopted by European languages (including English and now languages worldwide) to describe scientific topics (sociology, medicine, anatomy, biology, all the '-logy' words, etc.) are also justifiably called adstrata. Another example is found in Spanish and Portuguese, which contain a heavy Semitic (particularly Arabic) adstratum; and Yiddish, which is a linguistic variety of High German with adstrata from Hebrew and Aramaic, mostly in the sphere of religion, and Slavic languages, by reason of the geopolitical contexts Yiddish speaking villages lived through for centuries before disappearing during the Holocaust.

Notable examples of substrate or superstrate influence

Substrate influence on superstrate

Superstrate influence on substrate

See also

Language shift
Language transfer
Trans-cultural diffusion
Pre-Greek substrate
Indo-Aryan superstrate in Mitanni
Graziadio Isaia Ascoli
Creole language
Relexification

References

Further reading
Benedict, Paul K. (1990). Japanese/Austro-Tai. Ann Arbor: Karoma.
Cravens, Thomas D. (1994). "Substratum". The Encyclopedia of Language and Linguistics, ed. by R. E. Asher et al. Vol. 1, pp. 4396–4398. Oxford: Pergamon Press.
 Hashimoto, Mantaro J. (1986). "The Altaicization of Northern Chinese". Contributions to Sino-Tibetan studies, eds John McCoy & Timothy Light, 76–97. Leiden: Brill.
Janhunen, Juha (1996). Manchuria: An Ethnic History. Helsinki: Finno-Ugrian Society.
Jungemann, Frédéric H. (1955). La teoría del substrato y los dialectos Hispano-romances y gascones. Madrid.
Lewin, Bruno (1976). "Japanese and Korean: The Problems and History of a Linguistic Comparison". Journal of Japanese Studies 2:2.389–412
Matsumoto, Katsumi (1975). "Kodai nihongoboin soshikikõ: naiteki saiken no kokoromi". Bulletin of the Faculty of Law and Letters (Kanazawa University) 22.83–152.
McWhorter, John (2007). Language Interrupted: Signs of Non-Native Acquisition in Standard Language Grammars. USA: Oxford University Press.
Miller, Roy Andrew (1967). The Japanese language. Chicago: University of Chicago Press.
Murayama, Shichiro (1976). "The Malayo-Polynesian Component in the Japanese Language". Journal of Japanese Studies 2:2.413–436
Shibatani, Masayoshi (1990). The languages of Japan. Cambridge: Cambridge UP.
Singler, John Victor (1983). "The influence of African languages on pidgins and creoles". Current Approaches to African Linguistics (vol. 2), ed. by J. Kaye et al., 65–77. Dordrecht.
Singler, John Victor (1988). "The homogeneity of the substrate as a factor in pidgin/creole genesis". Language 64.27–51.
Vovin, Alexander (1994). "Long-distance relationships, reconstruction methodology and the origins of Japanese". Diachronica 11:1.95–114.

 
Language contact
Historical linguistics